is a Japanese historian specializing in international politics military history, specifically French Indochina. He was born in the Tokyo. He is a graduate of the Sophia University foreign language department. As of 1999, he lectures part-time at Sophia University and at Caritas Junior College. Currently he is working as a researcher for the Japanese Ministry of Defense where he does research on military history.

Works
The Second World War and French Indochina 第二次世界大戦とフランス領インドシナ――「日仏協力」の研究』（彩流社, 2000年）
（石津朋之・道下徳成・塚本勝也）エア・パワー――その理論と実践（シリーズ軍事力の本質１）』（芙蓉書房, 2005年）(co-editor)
マイケル・シャラー （五味俊樹・原口幸司・山崎由紀）『アジアにおける冷戦の起源――アメリカの対日占領』（木鐸社, 1996年）(co-translator)
デイヴィッド・J・バーカソン （池内光久）『カナダの旗の下で――第二次世界大戦におけるカナダ軍の戦い』（彩流社, 2003年）(co-translator)

References 

1966 births
Living people
20th-century Japanese historians
Writers from Tokyo
Academic staff of Sophia University
Sophia University alumni
21st-century Japanese historians